The Coburn Covered Bridge is a historic covered bridge, carrying Coburn Road over the Winooski River in eastern East Montpelier, Vermont.  Built in 1851, it is the town's only surviving 19th-century covered bridge.  It was listed on the National Register of Historic Places in 1974.

Description and history
Coburn Road runs north from United States Route 2, roughly paralleling the south-flowing Winooski River and eventually crossing it. The bridge is oriented east-west, and is a single-span queenpost truss structure with embedded iron rods. The portals are sheathed to their full height in vertical siding, and have segmented-arch tops. The bridge roof is metal. The roadway deck consists of three steel beams carrying a concrete floor; this is the result of work done in the 1970s.

The bridge was built about 1851, and is the town's only covered bridge.

See also
 
 
 
 
 National Register of Historic Places listings in Washington County, Vermont
 List of covered bridges in Vermont
 List of bridges on the National Register of Historic Places in Vermont

References

Bridges on the National Register of Historic Places in Vermont
National Register of Historic Places in Washington County, Vermont
Bridges completed in 1851
Covered bridges in Washington County, Vermont
Buildings and structures in East Montpelier, Vermont
Wooden bridges in Vermont
Queen post truss bridges in the United States
Road bridges in Vermont
1851 establishments in Vermont